Untitled is the second album by the American pop rock duo The Rembrandts. It was released in 1992 on East West Records.

"Johnny, Have You Seen Her?" peaked at No. 54 on the Billboard Hot 100 singles chart, but unlike the duo's previous and subsequent albums, Untitled failed to chart in the U.S.

Critical reception
AllMusic wrote that "while the subject matter -- mainly songs of yearning and lost love -- hasn't changed much since the debut, the subtle string arrangements and minor-key melodies blend quite nicely, bringing out the themes more fully." The Los Angeles Times called the album "a lush Beatles-influenced collection." Phoenix New Times wrote that, occasionally, the band's "considerable pop smarts give way to cutesy pretension."

Track listing
All songs written by The Rembrandts except as indicated.

"Johnny, Have You Seen Her?"
"Maybe Tomorrow"
"Rollin' Down the Hill"
"One Horse Town" (The Rembrandts, Michael Tienken)
"Sweet Virginia"
"Chase the Clouds Away"
"Hang On to Forever"
"Hang On, Clementine!"
"Waiting to Be Opened"
"I'll Come Callin'" (The Rembrandts, Tienken)
"The Deepest End"
"In the Back of Your Mind"

References

1992 albums
The Rembrandts albums
Atco Records albums